The 2016 Syracuse Orange men's soccer team represented Syracuse University during the 2016 NCAA Division I men's soccer season. It was the program's 93nd season. The #8 seeded Orange reached the third round/Sweet 16 of the 2016 NCAA Division I Men's Soccer Championship, where they lost to fellow ACC team, the 9th seeded North Carolina Tar Heels.

Roster

Squad 

This was the Syracuse roster for the 2016 season.

Coaching staff

Schedule 
Source: 

|-
!colspan=6 style="background:#FF6F00; color:#212B6D;"| Exhibitions
|-

|-
!colspan=6 style="background:#FF6F00; color:#212B6D;"| Regular season
|-

|-
!colspan=6 style="background:#FF6F00; color:#212B6D;"| ACC Tournament
|-

|-
!colspan=6 style="background:#FF6F00; color:#212B6D;"| NCAA Tournament
|-

|-

MLS Draft 
The following members of the 2016 Syracuse Orange men's soccer team were selected in the 2016 MLS SuperDraft.

References 

Syracuse
Syracuse Orange men's soccer seasons
Syracuse men's soccer
Syracuse
Syracuse